The Fundy Biosphere Region is located next to the upper Bay of Fundy, covering 442,250 hectares in New Brunswick, Canada. The area was named and designated as such by the United Nations Educational, Scientific and Cultural Organization (UNESCO) in 2007.

Fundy Biosphere Initiative Inc. is an environmental non-profit organization whose mission is based on the conservation of biodiversity and the promotion of sustainable development within the Bay of Fundy Canada

UNESCO is still involved within this development today; the Bay itself contains a lot to observe and its development

Hopewell Rocks is the provincial park located within the Bay of Fundy, Canada.

It is on a main priority list within UNESCO no other information was placed.

Geography

The Fundy Biosphere Region is situated in south-eastern New Brunswick. It includes the watershed of the Bay of Fundy between Saint Martins and borders Nova Scotia. The central area of the reserve corresponds with Fundy National Park. The reserve also includes the city of Moncton, which is the only officially bilingual city in Canada.

The reserve is located on the Bay of Fundy which is tied with Ungava Bay for the largest tidal range on earth.

The Fundy Biosphere Region extends over an area of 442,250 hectares adjacent to the upper Bay of Fundy in New Brunswick. The region begins at Saint Martin's, passes through Moncton, including almost all of Albert County, and stops at the Tantramar Marsh, close to Sackville. The borders of the region follow the limits of the watershed of the upper region of the Bay of Fundy.

The region is divided into three zones:

Core area: 20,600 hectares: devoted to long-term conservation. In the case of the Fundy Biosphere Region, this central region is represented by Fundy National Park.
Buffer zone: 26,124 hectares: Human activity in this zone is controlled to ensure the conservation of the core area. The buffer zone includes the protected natural areas of Little Salmon River, Dowdall Lake, McManus Hill, Point Wolfe River Gorge, Caledonia Gorge, Wilson Brook, provincial parks including the Fundy Trail and the Hopewell Rocks, and the National Wildlife Areas of Shepody and Tantramar.
Transition area: 395,552 hectares: reserved for local activities that promote sustainable development.

Biology and ecology 
The reserve contains a variety of habitats including mixed wood forests, tidal mudflats and salt marshes. Like much of this part of the North American coastline, the coastline is rocky. UNESCO has identified 8 species in the reserve that require conservation efforts, including the peregrine falcon and the Canada lynx.

History

The initiative to create the Fundy Biosphere Region came from a group of volunteers in 1999. FBR was officially recognized by UNESCO on November 21, 2007.
It became a member of a family of 19 other Canadian biosphere regions and one of over 700 biosphere regions throughout the world.

Initially, the project was titled The Fundy Biosphere Reserve Initiative (FBRI). A planning committee was formed to examine the requirements of UNESCO's Man and the Biosphere Programme, work with the Canadian Biosphere Reserves Association (CBRA), and seek input from stakeholders including conservation groups, resources sectors, academic institutions, and scientists.

The committee suggested that the region currently recognized be called the Fundy Biosphere and secured UNESCO designation by meeting the requirements: evidence of unique ecosystems, landscapes, and heritage of the area. The committee also sought to enhance the image of the area regionally, nationally, and internationally as well as encourage the development of a sustainable economy in the region. At this time, the objectives of FBR were to encourage investment in the public and private sectors, attract technical expertise, and enable scientists to participate in sustainable development strategies.

The planning committee's proposition was based on the following:

 Identify the special landscapes in the region of the Bay of Fundy and their unique attributes; 
 Identify the history and the culture of the region;
 Identify citizen initiatives and the various stakeholders’ engagement in the sustainable development of the region.

A temporary board of directors was established in 2006 to manage the project. UNESCO then gave approval from its Board to continue with the appointment process. The review process was carried out by 16 communities within the region, 5 provincial government departments, the Canadian Commission for UNESCO, and a national review committee at the Head Office of UNESCO in Paris, France.

The final proposition was submitted to UNESCO in the summer of 2007, and the official designation was obtained in the fall of 2007, after which the Board of Directors established the structure of the organization. The project was renamed the Fundy Biosphere Reserve (FBR) (later renamed Fundy Biosphere Region) and Fundy Biosphere Initiative Inc.

Organization

Fundy Biosphere Initiative Inc. is an environmental, non-profit organization that works with local communities, conservation groups, natural resource sectors, tourism organizations, and academic institutions to ensure the conservation of the biodiversity in the upper region of the Bay of Fundy, thereby promoting sustainable economic development.

The UNESCO Fundy Biosphere Region is dedicated to the conservation of biodiversity and the promotion of sustainable economic development. Its vision is to assist communities located in the upper Bay of Fundy to be more sustainable by working with various stakeholders while preserving the area's natural heritage.	

Fundy Biosphere Region works in three spheres of activities to support its goals:
Conservation – Ensure the conservation of ecosystems, species and genetic diversity in the region of Fundy.
Sustainable Development – Promote sustainable development in the region. Sustainable development is a development that is ecologically, socially and economically sustainable for further generations.
Capacity Building – Provide an information-sharing network between the FBR and various stakeholders. The capacity building aims for awareness, education, training and research.

Among other things, the objectives of the FBR are to:

Work with stakeholders in order to help communities become more sustainable.
Exchange information with the public and stakeholders.
Develop a governance model based on Research, Monitoring, Education and Outreach committees.

Projects and initiatives

Generally, the projects of the Fundy Biosphere Region revolve around three fields of activities: conservation, sustainable development, and capacity building. The Fundy Biosphere Region's ongoing projects touch sustainable tourism, local knowledge and climate, trails and amazing places in the Biosphere Region and education of the public on their own environmental footprint.

See also
List of UNESCO Biosphere Reserves in Canada

References

External links
 http://www.fundy-biosphere.ca
 http://www.pc.gc.ca/pn-np/nb/fundy/index.aspx
 http://www.thehopewellrocks.ca/
 https://sites.google.com/a/fundy-biosphere.ca/the-bay-of-fundy-mudflats/

Geography of New Brunswick
Biosphere reserves of Canada
Geography of Albert County, New Brunswick